Kabbah or Kabba is a common surname among the Mandinka people of West Africa. Notable people with the surname include:

Ahmad Tejan Kabbah, Former president of Sierra Leone
Haja Afsatu Kabba, Sierra Leone's minister of Energy and Power

Surnames of African origin